DJ Darkzone (born Michael Baur) is a German underground electronic music producer and DJ.

Career
Baur worked for some time as a club DJ, a radio DJ, and a music producer for various advertising companies. In 1989, Baur expanded his musical career by establishing the Manifold Records Music & Marketing label. For the label's first release, Baur produced the vinyl-only single "I Like the House" under the alias "Beatproduction." The song became quite popular throughout local clubs and private radio stations and would earn Baur considerable success. With his newfound success, Baur went on to establish his own recording studio for his music and advertising productions, and he also founded a music publishing company.

One of the Manifold label's greatest successes came in 1995, when Baur, working under the alias "DJ Crack," released the song "Singular." The song was played during the Mayday music festival of that year, and quickly became an underground club hit.

To this date, Baur has released numerous successful club hit singles, most popular in the underground club scene in Europe. However, Baur's first move into the mainstream music scene came when he licensed several of his label's songs to be included on the soundtrack for the highly popular Rockstar racing video game Midnight Club II.

Genres and aliases
Currently, Michael Baur tours as a club DJ throughout Europe and the United States. Baur is notorious for his use of many aliases in order to differentiate between the many genres of his music productions. His use of numerous aliases arguably enhances his underground status to an extreme. Most of his releases are under the "DJ Darkzone" and "DJ Crack" aliases, both classified under techno and trance. DJ Darkzone is most famous in the United States for his song "Infinity in Your Hands," which was primarily featured in the commercials for Midnight Club 2.

Under another alias, "Michael da Brain," Baur produces songs in the acid techno genre. Fellow label producers Franz Merwald (under the alias Frank D. Noise) and Martin Kaiser (under the alias Ray Clarke) also produce their own acid techno songs. Together, the three release their acid techno songs under the group alias "Brain," sometimes collaborating on individual Brain songs as well. Along with their song names, Brain songs are given numbers in the order of their time of release, starting from "Brain 1."

Michael Baur and several other artists (including labelmates Ray Clarke and Eric del Mar) produce songs under the group alias "Code" in the same fashion as "Brain." Baur has over 13 unique aliases, not including those used in group aliases. Genres of his music include, but are not limited to: hip hop, hardcore techno, jungle, acid techno, trance, dance, and house. Michael Baur tends to remix his labelmates' songs exclusively. He has been known to remix one of his own songs and then attribute the mix to a different alias of his.

Discography
For releases attributed to the DJ Darkzone alias only.

Albums
2005 1st Album

Singles
1999 Des Teufels Antwort
2000 Watching You
2000 Power & Energy
2001 The Human Form
2002 Overdrive
2002 Megamix
2002 Infinity in Your Hands
2002 Da Name of My DJ
2004 Melo Surrounding

DJ Mix Compilations
2000 DJ Darkzone at the Club
2001 DJ Darkzone Presents Power & Energy 2001
2001 DJ Darkzone Presents Clubmasters
2001 Tranzworld All Stars V.2 - DJ Tom and Mind-X vs DJ Darkzone
2002 DJ Darkzone vs. DJ Crack - Techno Universe
2003 Webster Hall TranzWorld All Stars V.3 - DJ Darkzone vs. DJ Crack
2005 DJ Darkzone Presents Club Stars

External links
Manifold Records Music & Marketing Official Website (link works only in Internet Explorer)
Discography on Discogs.com
Midnight Club II Official Website

Year of birth missing (living people)
Living people
German DJs
Video game musicians
Place of birth missing (living people)
Electronic dance music DJs